Orienticius is a genus of spiders in the family Salticidae. It was first described in 2016 by Prószyński. , it contains 2 species.

Taxonomy
The genus Orienticius was one of a number of new genera erected by Jerzy Prószyński in 2016, largely for species formerly placed in Pseudicius. In Wayne Maddison's 2015 classification of the family Salticidae, Pseudicius, broadly circumscribed, is part of the Salticoida clade of the subfamily Salticinae.

References

Salticidae
Salticidae genera
Spiders of Russia
Spiders of Asia